Lieutenant General Sir Edmund Augustus Whitmore  (8 July 1819 – 14 December 1890) was a senior British Army officer who went on to be Military Secretary.

Military career
Born in Malta, Whitmore was commissioned into the 30th Regiment of Foot in 1841. He went on to be Adjutant of his Regiment in 1846.

He served in the Crimean War and was decorated with the Order of the Medjidie (5th Class).

By 1861 he was Military Secretary to the Commander-in-Chief, Ireland. In 1876 he was made Inspector-General of Recruiting at Army Headquarters.

Appointed Military Secretary in 1880, Whitmore was accused of failing to advance "only the most thorough efficient men". He retired in 1885.

In retirement he became Colonel of the East Lancashire Regiment from 1889 to his death the following year.

He died in 1890.

References

 

1819 births
1890 deaths
British Army generals
Knights Commander of the Order of the Bath
East Lancashire Regiment officers
30th Regiment of Foot officers
Recipients of the Order of the Medjidie, 5th class
British Army personnel of the Crimean War